His Majesty's hired armed cutter Diligent  (or Diligente) served the British Royal Navy during the French Revolutionary Wars. She was a small vessel, of 44 tons (bm) and six 2-pounder guns, and she served from 27 February 1793 to 1 November 1801.

Diligent recaptured Myrmidon. Myrmidon had been sailing from Newcastle with a cargo of lumber when a privateer captured her. Diligent sent her into Sheerness, where Myrmidon arrived around 14 July 1797. 
 
Diligent, under the command of Mr. Matthew Randall, was in the fleet under Admiral Lord Duncan at the Battle of Camperdown on 11 October. Diligents role was to stand off the larboard or lee division and repeat signals. After the battle, as a member of the fleet even though she did not participate in the combat, she was entitled to share in the £120,000 in prize money for the sale of the Dutch ships captured then. In 1847 the Admiralty awarded the Naval General service Medal with clasp "Camperdown" to any surviving claimants from the action. Diligents officers and crew qualified.

On 24 October 1798  took two Dutch ships, Waakzaamheid and Furie in the Texel. The sloop , Diligent, and several other vessels shared in the proceeds of the capture.

At some point, Diligent, still under Randall's command, recaptured William and Freedom.

In 1799 Diligent, under the command of Thomas Dawson, was on the Downs and North Sea station.

Diligente was among the vessels that shared in the proceeds of the capture of the galiot Neptunus on 29 March 1799.

Diligent participated in the Anglo-Russian invasion of Holland in the naval part of the expedition under the command of Vice-admiral Admiral Archibal Dickson Andrew Mitchell. On 27 August, Diligent participated in the capture of three Dutch vessels. Three days later, Diligent was among the British vessels at the Vlieter Incident, and therefore shared in the prize money for it too.

The sloop  and Diligent detained , and some neutral vessels, on 30 August 1800.

He stated in a letter that he intended to augment the patrol with Inspector and the cutters Hazardand Diligent when they arrived.

Notes, citations, and references
Notes

Citations

References

Duncan, Robert Adam Philips Haldane, 3rd Earl of Camperdown (1898) Admiral Duncan. (Longmans, Green, and Company).
Norie, J. W. (1842) The naval gazetteer, biographer, and chronologist : containing a history of the late wars, from their commencement in 1793 to their conclusion in 1801; and from their re-commencement in 1803 to their final conclusion in 1815; and continued, as to the biographical part, to the present time. (London, C. Wilson).
Steel, David (1801) Steel's Naval Remembrancer: From the Commencement of the War in 1793 to the End of the Year 1800.

Hired armed vessels of the Royal Navy